WORLD END is FLOW's sixteenth single. Its A-Side was used as the second opening theme song for Code Geass: Lelouch of the Rebellion R2. It reached number 4 on the Oricon charts in its first week and charted for 10 weeks. *

Track listing

References

2008 singles
2008 songs
Code Geass
Flow (band) songs
Ki/oon Music singles
Anime songs